Flying Monsters 3D is a natural history documentary about the pterosaurs. It was written and presented by David Attenborough and was produced by National Geographic and Atlantic Productions for Sky 3D. Originally broadcast on Christmas Day 2010, it was the first 3D documentary to be screened on British television and was released in theatres and IMAX cinemas the following year. Flying Monsters 3D went on to become the first 3D programme to win a BAFTA award, winning in the category for Best Specialist Factual in 2011.

Featured animals
Dimorphodon
Darwinopterus
Pteranodon
Tapejara
Quetzalcoatlus

References

External links
 Official website for Flying Monsters 3D theatrical release
 Programme website at Atlantic Productions
 Official 2D trailer from Atlantic Productions
 

3D television shows
Documentary films about nature
2010 British television series debuts
Documentary films about prehistoric life
IMAX documentary films
3D documentary films
3D short films
2010 films
2010 3D films
2010 short documentary films
BAFTA winners (television series)